Sillery, a former independent city founded in 1637, is one of 35 administrative sectors, which are unincorporated places, located in the post-expansion jurisdiction of the City of Quebec, Quebec, Canada.  Sillery was one of multiple self-governing municipalities amalgamated into a vastly expanded Quebec City, that went into legal effect on January 1, 2002, as part of the province-wide 2000–06 municipal reorganization in Quebec. Located alongside in what pre-merger was the southwestern border of Quebec City, Sillery is a constituent district of the borough of Sainte-Foy–Sillery–Cap-Rouge. The territorially expanded City of Quebec consists of six boroughs.

Four heritage sites are located within Quebec City, one of which is situated in Sillery.  The neighbourhood of Sillery contains the Sillery Heritage Site, which was recognized as heritage district by the provincial government on 5 February 1964.  On 22 June 2006, the federal government's Parks Canada included Sillery's  historic district on its Canadian Register of Historic Places. In 2013, Quebec City changed the name of the historic district to Sillery Heritage Site, as part of its preparation for the provincial government's transfer of responsibility for the district's management to it.

The City of Quebec has 27 neighbourhood councils spread across its territorial jurisdiction.  Sillery has city representation and citizen participation through le conseil de quartier de Sillery. The council has public meetings, at Sillery's community centre, which on average are scheduled once a month.  Sillery elects a total of 10 board members in staggered terms of office holding.

History 
Sillery was named for Noël Brûlart de Sillery (1577–1640), Knight of Malta. A wealthy and successful French diplomat, he renounced worldly goods and became a Catholic priest. He provided the funds for the establishment in 1637–1638 of a settlement for First Nations converts to Catholicism.

The community was established at a cove where the Algonquin gathered for summer to fish for eels. Originally named in honour of Saint Joseph and called Kamiskouaouangachit in the Algonquin language, the settlement became the home of up to 40 Algonquin Christian families who lived there most of the year, excluding the hunting season. The formation of this settlement came as a result of longterm Algonquin interest in agriculture, conversions to Christianity, and pressure from the ongoing Beaver War. The residents included Algonquins from as far away as the Ottawa river valley.

Missionaries to New France, such  as Jacques Gravier, studied with the indigenous residents of Sillery to learn their languages before going to more distant settlements. By the early 18th century, he had compiled a nearly 600–page dictionary of Kaskaskia Illinois–French. By 1640, the Augustinian sisters established a convent in the community, which hosted non-permanent residents of the community, especially refugees of the Beaver War or seasonal visitors in winter. Many of the community's natives fell victim to epidemics of new infectious diseases, to which they had no natural immunity. The settlement was largely depopulated by the late 1680s.

Renamed Sillery in honour of its financier, the town later became important as a port for the lumber industry.  The city of Sillery's motto was non multa sed multum, the Latin proverb of "not many things, but much," a fit descriptor for the small enclave.  From the land at the water's edge, including Anse-au-Foulon, site of the disembarkation of General Wolfe's successful army in the Battle of the Plains of Abraham, the community spread up to the top of the heights overlooking the Saint Lawrence River.  In 1760, during the French and Indian War, the Battle of Sainte-Foy was fought near Sillery, as part of a French attempt to re-capture Quebec City, which had been taken by the British the previous year.

Sillery houses Bois-de-Coulonge Park, once the viceregal residence of Quebec. A villa known as Spencer Wood was built in 1854 by the government of the Province of Canada, and was purchased by the Quebec Government in 1870 to serve as the residence of Quebec's Lieutenant-Governors until 1966, when a major fire destroyed the main residence.  Originally an estate named in honour of the assassinated United Kingdom Prime Minister Spencer Perceval, in 1815, by his nephew, Michael Henry Perceval, it was renamed Bois-de-Coulonge in 1950.

Commanding the bluffs just west of the city of Québec, in modern times Sillery was known principally for its quiet tree-lined streets, historic churches such as Saint-Michel de Sillery Church, views of the river, and several very old schools run by a variety of religious institutes.  Its coat of arms consisted of a red shield with a white Maltese cross in the upper right hand corner and a three-masted ship in the lower left.

Profile 

On January 1, 2002, as part of a legislated amalgamation of cities across Quebec, Sillery ceased to exist as an independent municipality. Its territory became a part of the Sainte-Foy—Sillery—Cap-Rouge Borough of Quebec.  Of the former municipalities that now comprise Quebec, Sillery was relatively linguistically diverse. In 2006, % of its population had at least English for mother tongue, and % for languages other than French or English, while for the census metropolitan area of Quebec City, it was respectively % and %.

Nonetheless, there is still a pocket of modest and small apartment buildings.

2006 Census data 
The city of Sillery was dissolved in 2002, but Statistics Canada still provided information up to the Census of 2006:

Population:  (-% change since 2001)
Number of private dwellings: 
Average household size :  persons
Median household income (for 2005): 
Percentage of Canadian citizens: %
Percentage of visible minority: 5%
Population over 15 years of age without a certificate, diploma or degree: %
Area:  km²
Density:  persons per km²

2016 Sociodemographic and economic profile 
In January 2019, the City of Québec published a longitudinal sociodemographic and economic profile of Sillery, utilizing Statistics Canada's census data for the years 1996, 2006, and 2016.

Population:  (-% change since 1996)
Number of private dwellings: 
Average household size :  persons
Median household income (for 2015): 
Percentage of Canadian citizens: %
Population over 15 years of age without a certificate, diploma or degree: %

Gallery

See also
 Bois-de-Coulonge Park — former location of Government House
 Saint-Michel de Sillery Church
 Sillery Heritage Site
 Mount Hermon Cemetery
 The History of Emily Montague, a 1769 novel written and set in Sillery

External links

References

1637 establishments in the French colonial empire
Catholic missions of New France
Neighbourhoods in Quebec City
First Nations history
Former municipalities in Quebec
Populated places disestablished in 2002